Team NSP–Ghost was a German UCI Continental cycling team.

Major wins
2009
Tour du Loir-et-Cher, Tino Thömel
Ronde van Midden-Nederland, Sebastian Forke

References

Defunct cycling teams based in Germany
Cycling teams based in Germany
Cycling teams established in 2011
Cycling teams disestablished in 2013
UCI Continental Teams (Europe)